Kliszów  is a village in the administrative district of Gmina Kije, within Pińczów County, Świętokrzyskie Voivodeship, in south-central Poland.

The village has an approximate population of 260. A decisive battle of the Great Northern War between Saxony–Poland–Lithuania and the Swedish Empire, the Battle of Kliszów, was fought near the village.

References

Villages in Pińczów County
Kielce Governorate
Kielce Voivodeship (1919–1939)